Lady Kitty Eleanor Lewis (née Spencer; born 28 December 1990) is a British model and aristocrat. She is the eldest child of Charles Spencer, 9th Earl Spencer, niece of Diana, Princess of Wales and the first cousin of William, Prince of Wales and Prince Harry, Duke of Sussex. Spencer is the spokesmodel for jewellery brand Bulgari and fashion company Dolce & Gabbana.

Early life and education 
Spencer was born at St Mary's Hospital, London on 28 December 1990 to Charles Spencer, Viscount Althorp (later the 9th Earl Spencer) and Victoria Lockwood. She is a member of the Spencer family, an English noble family that holds multiple peerages. Spencer has three younger siblings and four younger half-siblings through her father's second marriage to Caroline Freud and third marriage to Karen Villeneuve and her mother's second marriage to Jonathan Aitken. Her paternal aunt was Diana, Princess of Wales. She is a first cousin of Prince William, Prince of Wales, and Prince Harry, Duke of Sussex.

She was raised in Cape Town, South Africa, where she attended Reddam House, a private school. After her parents divorced in 1997, Spencer spent her time between her native United Kingdom with her father and South Africa with her mother.

In 2009 Spencer was presented as a debutante at the Hôtel de Crillon's le Bal des Débutantes in Paris. Spencer studied psychology, politics, and English literature at the University of Cape Town. She later studied art history and Italian in Florence, Italy, before completing a master's degree in luxury brand management from the European Business School London at Regent's University London.

Career 
In 1992, when Spencer was one year old, she appeared with her mother on the cover of Harper's Bazaar UK. Spencer is signed with Storm Model Management, and made her professional modelling debut in 2015 in the December issue of Tatler. In September 2017 she walked for Dolce & Gabbana in a fashion show during Milan Fashion Week. She was the 2017 June covergirl of Hello Fashion Monthly, and was featured on the cover of Vogue Japan. She walked the runway for Dolce & Gabbana in their 2017 Christmas show at Harrods. In 2018, Spencer was a featured model in Dolce & Gabbana's Venetian spring/summer print campaign. During 2018 Milan Fashion Week Spencer walked in Dolce & Gabbana's Secrets & Diamonds fashion show.

In May 2018 BVLGARI announced that Spencer would be the new face of the jewellery brand, working as their newest brand ambassador. She had previously modelled for the jewellery designer, modelling the brand's Diva's Dream diamond necklace.

On 23 September 2018, Spencer walked in a fashion show in Milan for Dolce & Gabbana's Spring 2019 collection. She also appeared in editorials for Marie Claire Spain and Elle Russia, and graced the covers of L'Officiel Brazil and Tatler, the latter alongside Helena Christensen. She was officially announced as a brand ambassador for Dolce & Gabbana in February 2021.

Personal life 
Although Lady Kitty is the 9th Earl Spencer's firstborn child, the title and family estates, Althorp and Spencer House, will pass to her younger brother, Viscount Althorp, due to primogeniture, as specified in the succession of the Earldom of Spencer. Spencer expressed her personal belief in gender equality, while also stating that she believes her brother should inherit.

In January 2020, Spencer announced her engagement to the 61-year-old South African-British multimillionaire businessman, Michael Lewis, chairman of fashion company Foschini Group. They married in Rome at the Villa Aldobrandini on 24 July 2021. Her wedding dress, a lace, long-sleeved Victorian-inspired gown, was designed by Dolce & Gabbana. The company designed five custom dresses in total for the celebrations, which took place over the course of three days. Spencer has three adult stepchildren from her husband's previous marriage.

Spencer is an ambassador for Centrepoint, a charity that supports homeless youth, and a trustee and patron for the military charity Give Us Time. In June 2017 Spencer helped raise £140,000 for the Elton John AIDS Foundation. She also has raised funds for Save the Children.

Notes

References 

1990 births
Debutantes of le Bal des débutantes
English female models
English socialites
University of Cape Town alumni
Homelessness activists
Living people
Daughters of British earls
English expatriates in South Africa
Fashion influencers
Alumni of European Business School London
Models from London
Kitty
British women bloggers
British debutantes
21st-century English women
21st-century English people